Hector Alfred Wijesinghe Jayewardene (22 July 1870 – 16 October 1913) was a Ceylonese (Sri Lankan) lawyer and politician. He was one of the prominent lawyers of his time, he was active in the political movement in Ceylon. He was an elected member of the Colombo Municipal Council for twenty years.

Born to James Alfred Jayewardene, a Proctor who was the Deputy Coroner of Colombo. His younger brothers included Colonel Theodore Godfrey Wijesinghe Jayewardene was a Member of the State Council for Balangoda electorate, John Adrian St. Valentine Jayewardene and Eugene Wilfred Jayewardene who became Judges of the Supreme Court.

Wilfred Jayewardene was educated at the St. Benedicts College, Wesley College and at the Royal College, Colombo and become a Proctor in 1893. In 1895 he was elected to the Colombo Municipal Council from the New Bazaar ward and held the post till his death. He was instrumental in Sir Ponnambalam Ramanathan winning the election for the seat of educated Ceylonese in the Legislative Council of Ceylon, the first political election in the island.

His nephew J R Jayewardene became the first executive President of Sri Lanka.

See also 
List of political families in Sri Lanka

References

External links
 The JAYEWARDENE Ancestry

1870 births
1913 deaths
Sinhalese lawyers
Alumni of Royal College, Colombo
People from British Ceylon
Colombo municipal councillors
Hector Alfred
Ceylonese proctors